Love and Rockets are an English rock band formed in 1985 by former Bauhaus members Daniel Ash (vocals, guitar and saxophone), David J (bass guitar and vocals) and Kevin Haskins (drums and synthesisers) after that group split in 1983. Ash and Haskins had recorded and performed in another band, Tones on Tail, between 1982 and 1984. Love and Rockets' fusion of underground rock music with elements of pop music provided an early catalyst for alternative rock. They released seven studio albums before breaking up in 1999 and reformed briefly in 2007 for a few live shows, before splitting again in 2009.

They are perhaps best known for their 1989 single "So Alive", which reached No. 3 on the Billboard Hot 100 chart.

History 

The band's name was taken from the comic book series Love and Rockets by the Hernandez brothers. Gilbert Hernandez later referred to the confusion caused by this in his book Love and Rockets X, as there were several different bands named "Love and Rockets" for a period.

Despite their previous band's status as a gothic rock act, Love and Rockets moved towards a slightly brighter and more pop-influenced sound, as demonstrated by their first minor hit being a cover of the Motown classic "Ball of Confusion" (reached #18 on the Canadian charts in January 1986). Their first studio album, 1985's Seventh Dream of Teenage Heaven (1985). Their second album, 1986's Express, continued in the same vein, adding even more of a pop feel to the mix. It included the dance hit "Yin and Yang (The Flowerpot Man)". The 1987 follow-up, Earth, Sun, Moon, had a more acoustic sound and spawned the minor hit "No New Tale to Tell". The following year, they released the single "The Bubblemen Are Coming" under the alias The Bubblemen.

In 1989 the band released their self-titled album, which presented a more AOR sound. The second single from the album was the T. Rex-inspired song "So Alive", which became a hit, reaching No. 3 on the Billboard Hot 100, a feat no Bauhaus-related band or artist has achieved before or since.

After a gruelling tour schedule in support of their big hit, Love and Rockets took a few years off before returning to the studio together. The result was a move to an electronic sound that had more in common with The Orb than their rock or goth roots. Their label, RCA Records, dropped them. They signed with Rick Rubin's American Recordings to release Hot Trip to Heaven in 1994, followed in 1996 by Sweet F.A.. In April 1995, during the recording of Sweet F.A., a fire broke out in the house owned by American Recordings, where the band were living and recording. None of the members were injured, but their visiting friend Genesis P. Orridge of Psychic TV was injured whilst escaping the fire. The band lost their gear (a photo of a burnt guitar was used for the album cover of Sweet F.A.) and months of work on the album. There was a lengthy legal battle between the band, their label, and the label's insurance company. Love and Rockets were found not responsible for the fire, but were left with a large legal bill. Lift came out in 1998 on Red Ant Records, and, after performing in Toronto in April, 1999, Love and Rockets disbanded.

Love and Rockets announced in October 2007 on their MySpace page that they would reform to play one song at "Cast a Long Shadow", a tribute to Joe Strummer and benefit for Strummerville, The Joe Strummer Foundation for New Music, on 22 December 2007 at the Key Club in West Hollywood, California. They covered The Clash's "Should I Stay or Should I Go", playing the song twice, the second time inviting members of the audience to join them onstage to sing along. They performed on 27 April 2008 at the Coachella Valley Music and Arts Festival, and also at Lollapalooza on 3 August 2008 in Chicago.

In an interview in June 2009, Ash emphatically stated that he had no further plans to play with Love and Rockets. "We've worked together since 1980. I really want to work with new people, I'm sure everybody feels the same."

A tribute album titled New Tales to Tell: A Tribute to Love and Rockets was released on 18 August 2009 featuring contributions from The Flaming Lips, Frank Black, Puscifer, A Place to Bury Strangers, Film School, Better Than Ezra, Johnny Dowd, The Dandy Warhols, Blaqk Audio, The Stone Foxes and Monster Magnet.

On January 23, 2023, Love and Rockets announced a reunion with their first concert in 15 years at the Cruel World Festival 2023 in Pasadena, California, Brookside at the Rose Bowl, on May 20, 2023.

Discography 

Studio albums

 Seventh Dream of Teenage Heaven (1985)
 Express (1986)
 Earth, Sun, Moon (1987)
 Love and Rockets (1989)
 Hot Trip to Heaven (1994)
 Sweet F.A. (1996)
 Lift (1998)

References

External links 

 

Bauhaus (band)
English alternative rock groups
English post-punk music groups
Musical groups from Northamptonshire
Musical groups established in 1985
Musical groups disestablished in 1999
Musical groups reestablished in 2007
Musical groups disestablished in 2009
1985 establishments in England